Armand Papazian (15 July 1928 – 16 December 1991) was a French racing cyclist. He rode in the 1952 Tour de France.

References

1928 births
1991 deaths
French male cyclists
Place of birth missing